Andare from Udamalala, Hambantota was a court jester employed by the King Keerthi Sri Rajasinghe (1742 - 1782) in Sri Lanka. He used to be an accomplished poet who could instantly compose verses, to suit  any ongoing situation. Despite being a mere joker, the tales suggest Andare had a superior intellect that aided him in turning situations to his favour. He was also a skilled archer who could allegedly shoot down a frog croaking in a pond at night by the sound it makes, for which feat he eventually received his title, "sadda vidda palanga pathira", from the king. After his death he was buried in the town of Udamalala, allegedly his hometown, where is tomb can be found on the banks of the Udamalala wewa. Many Sinhala stories are about his life. He was cunning since the beginning. Two stories are about his childhood. The first one is when he ate some oil cakes and said he gave them to a hungry man, who was Andare himself. The second one is when his mom told him “ගොනෙක් වගේ ඉන්න” before a wedding. She meant ‘behave well’ but it literally translated to ‘behave like an ox’, so Andare did behave like an ox.

References

Jesters
Sinhalese courtiers
Humorous poets
People of the Kingdom of Kandy
1742 births
Year of death missing